Let Me Introduce Her is a South Korean television series starring Nam Sang-mi, Kim Jae-won, and Jo Hyun-jae. The series aired  four consecutive  episodes on Saturday on SBS TV from July 14 to September 29, 2018.

Synopsis
The story of Ji Eun-han who loses her memory after undergoing plastic surgery to assume another identity, and searches for memories to find out who she was.

Cast

Main
 Nam Sang-mi as Ji Eun-han
 A woman who loses her memory after a plastic surgery.
 Kim Jaewon as Han Kang-woo
 Ji Eun-han's plastic surgeon.
 Jo Hyun-jae as Kang Chan-ki
 A news anchorman and Ji Eun-han's husband.

Recurring
 Lee Mi-sook as Min Ja-young
 Han Eun-jung as Jung Soo-jin
 Yang Jin-sung as Song Chae-young 
 Lee Dae-yeon as Han Young-cheol
 Kim Roi-ha as Detective Kim
 Kim Jung-young as Lee Sook-hyun 
 Jung Young-joo as Madame Hwang
 Jeong Jinwoon as Han Hee-young
 Lee Ho-jung as Lee Hyun-soo 
 Kim Bo-kang as Jang Seok-joon
 Kang Hoon as Ji Soo-han
 Lee Si-a as Ji Eun-han
 Kim Jung-young as Ji Eun-han's mother.

Production
The first script reading took place on May 22, 2018 at SBS Prism Tower in Sangam-dong, Seoul, South Korea.

Let Me Introduce Her was the last drama series executive produced by Kim Yong-jin for SBS Plus before he became the vice-president and head of scripted programming of Kakao M's television production subsidiary Mega Monster the same year. (His first project with Mega Monster (as showrunner/executive producer), the mystery-thriller miniseries Children of Nobody, premiered on rival network MBC TV almost two months after Let Me Introduce Her aired its last episode.)

Plagiarism controversy
In September 2018, South Korean production company DK E&M (CEO Kim Dong-gu), the company behind the dramas Blow Breeze, Working Mom Parenting Daddy and Here Comes Mr. Oh, announced an intention to file a plagiarism lawsuit against SBS, its subsidiary SBS Plus and Shinyoung E&C Group, accusing Let Me Introduce Her of  "plagiarizing" the 1999 Japanese drama Beautiful Person. DK E&M has been in talks with TBS (the original network of Beautiful Person) since November 2017 to produce a Korean drama adaptation of it, and was planning to broadcast the series in 2019 but that was affected, allegedly because SBS aired Let Me Introduce Her first.

SBS has since denied the accusation, stating that "only the themes of plastic surgery and romance are similar" in the two dramas. It also plans to file a defamation suit against DK E&M for the latter's "baseless" claims.

On October 8, 2018, DK E&M sought help from the Korean Television and Radio Writers Association regarding the controversy, saying that "the attitude of SBS regarding the situation was disappointing".

Original Soundtrack

Part 1

Part 2

Part 3

Part 4

Part 5

Ratings
In the table below,  represent the lowest ratings and  represent the highest ratings.
NR denotes that the drama did not rank in the top 20 daily programs on that date.
 N/A denotes that the rating is not known.

Awards and nominations

See also
 Love in Sadness, the official remake of Beautiful Person

Notes

References

External links 
 
 

Seoul Broadcasting System television dramas
2018 South Korean television series debuts
Korean-language television shows
South Korean mystery television series
South Korean thriller television series
South Korean romance television series
2018 South Korean television series endings
Television shows involved in plagiarism controversies
Fiction about amnesia